"The Way of the World" is a short story by Willa Cather. It was first published in Home Monthly in April 1898.

Plot summary
Six boys live quietly together.  Their main play is creating their "town": one boy is mayor, another a grocer, and so on.  One day a girl, Mary Eliza Jenkins, makes friends with the mayor and the other "men", until they let her become a full citizen and open a new restaurant. It is a success until a boy from Chicago comes along and she devotes all her time to him. When the others tell her he must go, she decides to start her own town with him nearby. After her departure, no one is willing to put in any work at the game any more.

References to other works
Roman mythology and Roman history are alluded to through Latium, Coriolanus and the Volscians, and Gaius Marius.

Literary significance and criticism
The ending of "The Way of the World" was later echoed in Flavia and Her Artists, with the reference to Caius Marius and the ruins of Carthage.

References

External links 
Full Edition at the Willa Cather Archive

1898 short stories
Short stories by Willa Cather
Works originally published in Home Monthly